Robert James Schmautz (March 28, 1945March 28, 2021) was a Canadian professional ice hockey forward who played 13 seasons in the National Hockey League (NHL).  He played for the Chicago Black Hawks, Vancouver Canucks, Boston Bruins, Edmonton Oilers, and Colorado Rockies from 1967 to 1981. He featured in three Stanley Cup Finals with the Bruins.

Early life
Schmautz was born in Saskatoon, Saskatchewan, on March 28, 1945.  He played junior hockey in his hometown with the junior Quakers and the Blades, before signing his first professional contract in 1964 with the Los Angeles Blades of the Western Hockey League (WHL).

Career
Schmautz played with the Blades until 1967, when he was signed by the Chicago Black Hawks of the National Hockey League (NHL).  His NHL rights were transferred to the St. Louis Blues in the 1969 intraleague draft; he ultimately never played for the Blues, instead being traded to the Montreal Canadiens three weeks later, and subsequently sold to the Salt Lake Golden Eagles of the WHL.  Salt Lake would also trade him, to the Seattle Totems.

Schmautz was signed as a free agent in 1970 by the Vancouver Canucks, an expansion team starting their first season in the NHL.  Though he started the season in the WHL, he joined the Canucks in February 1971.  He led the team in scoring during the 1972–73 season with 38 goals and 33 assists, and had the second-most hat-tricks in the NHL with three.  He was named to the 1973 and 1974 NHL All-Star Games.

Schmautz was subsequently traded to the Boston Bruins midway through the 1974 season. Playing under Bruin coach Don Cherry, Schmautz developed into an accomplished forechecker and backchecker, usually playing right wing on a line with future Hall-of-Famer Johnny Bucyk and versatile center Gregg Sheppard.  He spent five seasons with Boston in all, finishing ninth in the NHL in game-winning goals in 1976 and 1978. Schmautz scored the overtime goal for Boston in Game Four of the 1978 Stanley Cup final versus Montreal to level the series at two games apiece.  A photograph of Schmautz celebrating his goal was used as the cover photo for the Bruins' 1978–1979 media guide.  Overall, Schmautz scored 26 playoff goals for Boston – the same total as Bobby Orr. At the time of Schmautz's death, he ranked 20th in Boston history with 56 playoff points.  Schmautz was known for having perhaps the great snap shot in the game.

He then briefly played for the Colorado Rockies and Edmonton Oilers, before signing back with Vancouver in 1980.  After the 1980–81 season, Schmautz was not offered a new contract by the Canucks, so he opted to retire. He subsequently moved to Portland, Oregon and worked in roofing.

Personal life 
Two of Schmautz's brothers also played hockey.  Cliff Schmautz played one season in the NHL at the same position as Bobby, appearing in 57 games for the Buffalo Sabres and Philadelphia Flyers and scoring 32 points in 1970–71.  Arnie Schmautz played 13 seasons in the WHL with the New Westminster Royals, Victoria Cougars, and Portland Buckaroos.  Both his brothers predeceased him.

Schmautz died on March 28, 2021, his 76th birthday, at his home in Peoria, Arizona.

Career statistics 
Source:

Regular season and playoffs

References

External links
 

1945 births
2021 deaths
Boston Bruins players
Canadian ice hockey right wingers
Chicago Blackhawks players
Colorado Rockies (NHL) players
Dallas Black Hawks players
Edmonton Oilers players
Ice hockey people from Saskatchewan
Los Angeles Blades (WHL) players
National Hockey League All-Stars
Rochester Americans players
Saskatoon Blades players
Seattle Totems (WHL) players
Sportspeople from Saskatoon
Vancouver Canucks players